Hugh Blythe (also Hugo Blythe) B.D. (died 1610) was a Canon of Windsor from 1572 to 1610 and Archdeacon of Leicester from 1589 to 1591.

Career

He was educated at King's College, Cambridge, where he graduated BA in 1564, MA in 1567, BD.

He was appointed:
Headmaster of Eton College ca. 1559
Rector of Appleby, Leicestershire 1572
Archdeacon of Leicester 1589 - 1591

He was appointed to the sixth stall in St George's Chapel, Windsor Castle in 1572 and held this until he died in 1610.

Notes 

1610 deaths
Canons of Windsor
Alumni of King's College, Cambridge
Head Masters of Eton College
Archdeacons of Leicester
Year of birth missing